Buralkynyn Tuzy is a salt lake in Sarysu District, Zhambyl Region, Kazakhstan.

Geography
Buralkynyn Tuzy is a sor-type of lake in the Chu basin. The Chu river flows westwards  to the south of the lake. The western part of the lake basin is flat and the eastern is steep. 

The lake fills during the spring thaw and usually dries up completely in the summer. If it has water at the end of the fall, it does not freeze in the winter owing to its high salinity.

See also
Kazakh semi-desert
List of lakes of Kazakhstan

References

External links

Lakes of Kazakhstan
Jambyl Region